Vince Hornsby (born October 22, 1967) is the bassist and one of the founding members of American rock band Sevendust.

Music career

Sevendust

Before the formation of Sevendust, Hornsby was in the band Snake Nation along with Morgan Rose, also of Sevendust. In 1994, Snake Nation were supported by fellow local group, Body & Soul, an R&B group fronted by Lajon Witherspoon. Amazed by Witherspoon's vocal prowess, Rose and Hornsby asked him to join their band. Next they recruited guitarists John Connolly, the former drummer of the band Peacedog, and Lee Banks to form Rumblefish. The name was later changed to Crawlspace. Clint Lowery of Still Rain from North Carolina replaced Lee Banks in 1995 when the band's arduous schedule forced him to quit. The band had much touring scheduled before and after the success of Home in 1999, including Woodstock, OzzFest and the Warped Tour.

When a group on the West Coast claimed the rights to Sevendust's previous name, Crawlspace, the band struggled to find a new name. While he doesn't take credit for the band's name, Hornsby ultimately came across a can of "Sevin Dust" while looking through his grandmother's garage.

In addition to being the tallest member of Sevendust at 6'2"(1.88), Hornsby is also the oldest member of the band and the only member who doesn't have any tattoos or piercings.

Projected
He has also played on fellow Sevendust member John Connolly's 2012 side-project Projected and their CD entitled Human.

Discography

Sevendust
Sevendust (1997)
Home (1999)
Animosity (2001)
Seasons (2003)
Next (2005)
Alpha (2007)
Chapter VII: Hope and Sorrow (2008)
Cold Day Memory (2010)
Black Out the Sun (2013)
Time Travelers & Bonfires (2014)
Kill the Flaw (2015)
All I See Is War (2018)
Blood & Stone (2020)

Projected
Human (2012)
Ignite My Insanity (2017)

The CEO
Redemption (2021)

Gear
Dean Hillsboro 4-string
Epiphone les paul signature bass
Epiphone les paul std bass
Epiphone les paul custom bass
Schecter Diamond P Custom 4
Peavey Tour 700 Series head
Peavey Tour 810 8x10
Hartke 4x10 Cabinets

References

1967 births
Living people
Musicians from Atlanta
American heavy metal bass guitarists
American male bass guitarists
Guitarists from Georgia (U.S. state)
20th-century American bass guitarists
Projected members
Sevendust members
20th-century American male musicians